The 2013 Shanghai International Film Festival was the 16th such festival devoted to international cinema held in Shanghai, China.

International Jury
The members of the jury for the Golden Goblet Award were:

 Tom Hooper (UK; president of the jury)
 Michel Ciment (French critic)
 Chris Kraus (German director)
 Khosro Masoumi (Iranian director)
 Jiří Menzel (Czech director, theater director and actor)
 Ning Hao (Chinese director)
 Yu Nan (Chinese actress)

Winners
 Best Feature Film: The Major, by Yury Bykov (Russia)
 Jury Grand Prix: Reliance "Förtroligheten", by William Olsson (Sweden)
 Best Director: Yury Bykov for The Major
 Best Actress: Crystal Lee in Unbeatable (China) directed by Dante Lam
 Best Actor: Nick Cheung in Unbeatable (China) directed by Dante Lam
 Best Screenplay: Angus MacLachlan for Reliance (Sweden) directed by William Olsson
 Best Cinematography: Vachan Sharma/Paul Blomgren Dovan for Reliance (Sweden) directed by William Olsson
 Best Music: Yury Bykov for The Major (Russia) directed by Yury Bykov

References

External links
 Official website

Shanghai International Film Festival
Shanghai International Film Festival
Shanghai
Shanghai
21st century in Shanghai